Ana Liliana Avião (born 25 August 1994) is an Angolan model and beauty pageant titleholder who won Miss Angola 2018. She represented Angola at Miss Universe 2018 pageant.

Personal life
She is a resident of the Netherlands. She holds a Bachelor in Business Studies.

Pageantry

Miss Angola 2018 
Avião was crowned as the winner of Miss Angola 2018 in a national finale held at Luanda. She succeeded outgoing Miss Angola 2017, Lauriela Martins.

Miss Universe 2018 
Avião represented Angola at Miss Universe 2018 pageant in Bangkok, Thailand.

References

External links
missangolaoficial.sapo.ao
missuniverse.com

1995 births
Angolan beauty pageant winners
Dutch people of Angolan descent
Living people
Miss Universe 2018 contestants
Miss Angola winners
People from Luanda